Microsoft Corp. v. i4i Ltd. Partnership, 564 U.S. 91 (2011), was a case decided by the Supreme Court of the United States.  Under 35 U.S.C. § 282, a patent is entitled to a presumption of validity in court. In i4i, the Court held that when a court reviews the validity of a patent, the presumption may only be overcome based on clear and convincing evidence.

The case was a patent dispute between i4i Ltd. Partnership and Microsoft: i4i charged that Microsoft Word infringed on i4i's patent; Microsoft argued that the clear and convincing evidence standard applied by the Federal Circuit was inappropriate and that a preponderance of the evidence standard should be applied.  The Court rejected Microsoft's position.

References

External links 
 

United States Supreme Court cases
United States patent case law
2011 in United States case law
Discovery and invention controversies
Software patent case law
United States Supreme Court cases of the Roberts Court